Events from the year 2004 in Indonesia

Incumbents

Events

January 10 - 2004 Palopo cafe bombing: Four people are killed and three injured
April 5 - Indonesian legislative election, 2004
May 5 - Final election results are announced: of 113,462,414 valid ballot papers, the Party of the Functional Groups (Golkar) win the largest number of seats on the People's Representative Council. However, fourteen of the twenty-four participating parties refuse to certify the election results after allegations of irregular vote counting.
July 5 & September 20 - Indonesian presidential election, 2004 
September 9 - 2004 Australian Embassy bombing in Jakarta: several civilian workers are killed, but all embassy staff survive.  
November 13 - 2004 Poso bus bombing; six people are killed.
November 30 - Lion Air Flight 583 
December 26 - The 2004 Indian Ocean earthquake and tsunami have huge effects on Indonesia

Deaths
 August 29 - Leonardus Benjamin Moerdani, Indonesian military leader and politician (born 1932)

References

 
Indonesia